{{DISPLAYTITLE:C6H8N2}}
The molecular formula C6H8N2 may refer to:

 Adiponitrile
 Dimethylpyrazine, an alkylpyrazine
 2-Methylglutaronitrile
 2-Picolylamine
 Phenylenediamines
 o-phenylenediamine 
 m-phenylenediamine
 p-phenylenediamine
 Phenylhydrazine